Telê Santana da Silva, also known as Telê Santana (July 26, 1931 – April 21, 2006) was a Brazilian football manager and former player (right winger). He was born in Itabirito, Minas Gerais.

Telê was the manager responsible for putting together the 1982 and 1986 Brazil national squads. The 1982 squad in particular is remembered as one of the greatest teams in football history not to win the World Cup. It included players such as Zico, Sócrates, Falcão, Júnior and Toninho Cerezo. He was also a highly successful manager of various club teams, including the legendary 1992 and 1993 São Paulo, and was also very influential with Atlético Mineiro and Fluminense.

Telê is often mentioned by the Brazilian sports press as being one of the most relevant football managers to ever work in the country. His preferred style of play was very offensive-minded, and he believed in training athletes by using relentless repetition of elementary fundamentals of the game, such as passing the ball and set piece training.

Career

First experiences 
Telê started playing for Itabirense Esporte Clube, headquartered near his home in Itabirito, and later played for América, from São João del-Rei.

Playing career
Telê played for clubs such as Fluminense, Madureira and Vasco da Gama. He was also a reserve player of the Brazil national football team. As a player, his preferred position was centre forward. However, he started his career as a goalkeeper.

Managerial career
His career as a manager started in 1967, coaching the Fluminense youth squad. Four years later, Telê led Atlético Mineiro to win its first Brazilian championship title. Regarded to have coached two of the best Brazil national squads ever in the 1982 and 1986 World Cups, he failed, however, to win the tournament in both occasions.

Besides the coaching of the Brazil national team, Santana returned to club management in 1988 at Flamengo, but enjoyed his palmiest days with São Paulo between 1990 and 1996. With an outstanding team featuring Zetti, Cafu, Raí, and Leonardo (all of the aforementioned players eventually made it to the national squad in 1994), the side won the Brazilian championship title in 1991, and then the Libertadores Cup in 1992 and 1993, the first time that a Brazilian club had won it in 10 years. In those same two seasons, São Paulo also claimed the world club title in Tokyo, beating first Johan Cruyff's FC Barcelona and then Fabio Capello's A.C. Milan. The memory of this squad is still very much regarded by the fans as one of the most spectacular in São Paulo's history.

Legacy
Santana is widely credited for the re-invention of the jogo bonito ("beautiful game" in Portuguese) by the vast majority of the Brazilian press. His full-attack mentality of play was best displayed with the 1982 Brazil national squad who fell 3–2 to Italy in the Second Round of the Cup. Santana was criticized by many for refusing to switch Brazil's forward style of play versus Italy, since Brazil only needed to tie the game to reach the Semifinals due to the original World Cup setup at the time. Some pundits felt that Santana should have placed more emphasis on defence and a counterattack strategy due to circumstances of the match. Regardless of the fact that Santana never led the Brazilian squad to glory, he is still regarded as one of greatest managers and innovators in the history of Brazilian football.

With regards to role models, Santana has mentioned in one interview that he had no idols, though: "my greatest satisfaction would be to manage a team such as 1974 Holland. It was a team where you could pick [Johan] Cruyff and place him on the right wing. If I had to put him in the left-wing, he would still play [the same]. I could choose Neeskens, who played both to the right and to the left of the midfield. Thus, everyone played in any position." He said he tried to use a similar tactic strategy in 1992's São Paulo, by using versatile players in different positions according to what was required in a match.

He was once considered by the media the "last romantic of the Brazilian football", and had always been a strong campaigner for the fair play and against violence in the game.

Death
In 1996, he had to retire, after suffering a stroke. He had part of his left leg amputated in 2003 because of ischemia in his left foot. He was operated at Hospital Felício Roxo, in Belo Horizonte.

Santana died on April 21, 2006, due to an abdominal infection. His body was buried at Cemitério Parque da Colina, in Belo Horizonte. His wife Ivonete and their son and daughter survive him.

Honours

As a Player

Club
1951 - Campeonato Carioca (Fluminense)
1952 - Copa Rio (Fluminense)
1957 - Torneio Rio-São Paulo (Fluminense)
1959 - Campeonato Carioca (Fluminense)
1960 - Torneio Rio-São Paulo (Fluminense)

As a Manager

Club
1969 - Taça Guanabara and Campeonato Carioca (Fluminense) 
1970 - Campeonato Mineiro (Atlético Mineiro)
1971 - Campeonato Brasileiro Série A (Atlético Mineiro)
1977 - Campeonato Gaúcho (Grêmio)
1983 - King's Cup (Al-Ahli)
1984 - Saudi League (Al-Ahli)
1985 - Gulf Club Champions Cup (Al-Ahli)
1988 - Campeonato Mineiro (Atlético Mineiro)
1989 - Taça Guanabara  (Flamengo)
1991 - Campeonato Brasileiro Série A (São Paulo)
1991, 1992 - Campeonato Paulista (São Paulo)
1992, 1993 - Copa Libertadores and Intercontinental Cup (São Paulo)
1993 - Supercopa Sudamericana (São Paulo)
1993, 1994 - Recopa Sudamericana (São Paulo)
1994 - Copa CONMEBOL (São Paulo)

Individual
1992 - South American Coach of the Year

Notes

References
Enciclopédia do Futebol Brasileiro, Volume 2 – Lance, Rio de Janeiro: Aretê Editorial S/A, 2001.

1931 births
2006 deaths
Sportspeople from Minas Gerais
Association football wingers
Brazilian footballers
Brazilian football managers
Campeonato Brasileiro Série A managers
Expatriate football managers in Saudi Arabia
1982 FIFA World Cup managers
1986 FIFA World Cup managers
Fluminense FC players
Guarani FC players
CR Vasco da Gama players
Fluminense FC managers
Clube Atlético Mineiro managers
São Paulo FC managers
Botafogo de Futebol e Regatas managers
Grêmio Foot-Ball Porto Alegrense managers
Sociedade Esportiva Palmeiras managers
Brazil national football team managers
Al-Ahli Saudi FC managers
CR Flamengo managers
Brazilian expatriate sportspeople in Saudi Arabia